Sardinero may refer to:
Estadio El Sardinero, a sports stadium in Santander, Cantabria, Spain
Estadio El Sardinero (1913), the old stadium in Santander, Cantabria, Spain
Sardinero, a beach in Santander, Cantabria, Spain